The 1948 Missouri Valley Vikings football team was an American football team that represented Missouri Valley College as a member of the Missouri College Athletic Union (MCAU) during the 1948 college football season.

During the season, Missouri Valley broke the all-time collegiate record of 39 consecutive wins. The 1948 season marked the end of a 41-game winning streak (1941–1942, 1946–1948) that still ranks as the fifth longest in college football history. Coach Ashford, who led the team during the streak, was later inducted into the College Football Hall of Fame.

Schedule

Notes

References

Missouri Valley
Missouri Valley Vikings football seasons
Missouri Valley Vikings football